Westminster Under School is a private preparatory school for boys aged 7 to 13, attached to Westminster School in London.

The school was founded in 1943 in the precincts of Westminster School in Little Dean's Yard, just behind Westminster Abbey. In 1951 the Under School relocated to its own premises in Eccleston Square. Due to rising numbers of pupils in the 1960s and 1970s, the school moved again in 1981 to its present site (a former hospital) overlooking the Westminster School playing fields in Vincent Square. There are 285 pupils attending the school. The school has a strong musical tradition and provides choristers for St Margaret's Church in Westminster Abbey. It also excels in sport, drama (having produced winners of the recent Shakespeare Schools Festival), chess and Latin. Most boys attending the school move on to Westminster School after the completion of either Common Entrance or Scholarship examinations (in the case of Westminster School, the Challenge), although a number of boys each year go on to other schools, including Eton.

The previous Master was Mark O'Donnell, who retired in 2020 due to ill health. Steve Bailey came out of his retirement in the 2020/21 academic year as an interim measure. The current Master is Kate Jefferson who is currently on maternity leave and so the Acting Master is Michael Woodside. There are 47 members of staff.

The school fees for the 2020-21 academic year are £6,834 per term.

History
The Under School was founded in September 1943 at 2 Little Dean's Yard (now known as Grant's House) by the former Headmaster of Westminster School, John Traill Christie. 
 
There were only 6 teachers when the school was established and only 31 boys. Dean's Yard was used as a playing field for the boys and the roofless remains of the school along with the bombed school hall were used as a playground. St Faith's Chapel in Westminster Abbey served as the school chapel. For much of the Under School's history, the final year (Year 8) was known as the Upper Remove and the second to last year (Year 7) was known as the Remove.

After the war, the school moved to its own premises in Eccleston Square, and in 1981 moved to its present site in Vincent Square to cope with expanding numbers.

Entrance
Competitive entrance examinations for Westminster Under School can be taken at 7+, 8+ or 11+. Entry to Westminster Under School at 11+ attracts many pupils from the state sector. At this stage, the school also offers Music Scholarships and means-tested bursaries.

Previous school fees

Campus
The school is housed in three buildings, listed below. As well as these buildings and the playing fields of Vincent Square, the school hires facilities at the Queen Mother Sports Centre in Victoria and at Battersea Park.

Adrian House 
Adrian House is situated at 27 Vincent Square, a four-storey building in the south-east corner of Vincent Square in central London. It opened in 1951 and underwent a major rebuilding programme in 2001, when new classrooms, a new hall, an Art Department (which became more classrooms following the opening of George House) and an IT suite were built on the site of the old hall. In addition, all the classrooms and labs were refurbished. The hall, which would also serve as a canteen prior to the opening of 21 Douglas Street and space for P.E. prior to the opening of Lawrence Hall as Westminster School Sports Centre (see below), is used for theatre and drama performances by the school. It was refurbished in the 2014 and renamed the Performing Arts Studio. Adrian House provides access to two science laboratories and the basement is devoted entirely to the music department.

George House 
George House, opposite Adrian House on 21 Douglas Street, opened in 2011 by the Dean of Westminster, the Very Reverend Dr John Hall. In 2014 it was given the name "George House". The building houses the Under School's Dining Room, Art Department, conference room, and staff meeting rooms.

Westminster School Sports Centre 
In September 2012, the Royal Horticultural Society's Lawrence Hall was leased by Westminster School for 999 years, and became the School's Sports Centre. It was officially opened by HM Elizabeth II in 2015. The building is located on Elverton Street, moments from Vincent Square. The Under School uses it for sport, including P.E. and Games, and Extras (see section below).

Customs
 The school, being attached to Westminster School, sends the oldest year of the school (Year 8) to take part in the annual pancake greaze on Shrove Tuesday. This is watched by the year below in the Great Hall. The school is Anglican and has a Thursday service in St Stephen's Church, Rochester Row.

The school also holds an annual Music Competition each summer in which all boys may enter one piece of music for any instrument they play. The winners and some runners-up from the Years 7 and 8 finals of the competition are invited to play in the school's annual Summer Concert in St John's, Smith Square, as well as the school's Senior String Orchestra, Senior Choir (made up of boys from Years 6, 7 and 8, also known as the Westminster Boys' Choir), the winning house choir and a number of instrumental ensembles.

There is also an annual reading competition, in which each boy chooses and learns a short piece of prose or poetry (whether it be fiction or not), based on a given theme, and learns it so it can be recited by heart. The competition is held in the Lent term and is compulsory for each boy to enter. These are both house events, so points are given to houses for the results of the competition which are added to other points from other competitions or events, for trophies.

A photography competition and a model competition are held by the art department (both optional to enter). There is also a general knowledge quiz, written by a Latin, Greek and sports teacher, S.R.H. James. S. R. H. James is also the author of the series, Latin I, Latin II and Latin III. The quiz is held annually at the start of winter, and is scored out of 100. Boys who obtain a set mark (set for each year) are permitted to the second round. Boys who do well in the second round are entered to the SATIPS nationwide General Knowledge quiz. The school also enters the Townsend Warner History Prize, a history competition for public schools.

Uniform

General 
The school uniform consists of a grey shirt, grey trousers, grey socks and grey tie with pink stripes. A grey jumper with a pink v-neck may also be worn and, in the summer, grey polo shirts and shorts may be worn without a tie.

Ties 
Certain positions of responsibility have ties which vary from the standard uniform. Senior choir (Years 6-8) have a black tie with white and pink stripes and house officials have ties which correspond to the colour of their house. Prefects have a pink tie with grey stripes and the head boy has a pink tie with black stripes.

Curriculum

Years 3 and 4
In Years 3 and 4, pupils are taught in most subjects by the same teacher (usually their form teacher), however they have specialist teachers in French, Music, Art and Design, IT, PE and Games. There is only one Year 3 form, typically of around 22 boys, and only 2 forms in Year 4 as the school typically accepts only 22 pupils per entry point. Until 2001, there was no Year 3 form, and the school accepted 42 boys into Year 4.

Years 5 and 6
In Year 5, the following subjects are taught, all by specialist teachers: Mathematics, English, Science, French, history, Geography, Religious Studies, Music, Art, Drama, IT, PE and Games but most are in their classroom. Year 5 were also formerly taught Roman and Greek mythology to prepare for when they start Latin in Year 6, however they have temporarily stopped. In Year 7, the boys are split into sets for Maths according to their performances in their Year 6 summer exams or 11+ entrance exams, depending on whether or not they were at the school in Year 6. When the list of boys who are to enter the school aged 11 the next year is confirmed, those boys begin to attend Saturday morning school so that they may begin to catch up in terms of curriculum with the Year 6s already at the school.

Year 7 
Another two forms are created for the 11+ entrance. In Year 7, the curriculum remains broadly the same as in Year 6.

Year 8
Going into Year 8, the year group is split into those who will take Common Entrance or a similar exam for their chosen future school and those who embark on what is known as the "Scholarship Course", in which they prepare for scholarship papers to their chosen future schools. In Year 8, there are four forms, two for those who will take Common Entrance, typically containing 18 or 19 boys each, and two other forms containing boys on the "Scholarship Course" – typically these forms will contain 16 students each. One scholarship form will contain exclusively those preparing for the Challenge, the scholarship exam to Westminster School, whilst the other will also contain boys preparing for scholarship exams to other schools.

Greek is added as an additional subject but is optional for scholarship boys going to other schools which do not require Greek. These boys do Latin separately during Greek lessons.

Houses
The school is organised into 4 houses, based on the charges on the Westminster Abbey, Westminster School and Westminster Under School coat of arms: Tudors (Red), Lions (Blue), Fleuries (Green) and Martlets (Yellow). There are regular inter-house competitions during the school year, including music, Scrabble and Chess. All the houses have a House Captain, Vice Captain and between two and four Prefects, selected from the Year 8s, who are changed every term. This is done in such a way that most of Year 8 will be either a House Captain, Vice Captain, Head Boy or Prefect at some point during the year.

Extras
The school has many Extras (or clubs) boys can take part in. These extras include bridge, chess, swimming, fencing, judo, karate, mandarin, LAMDA, indoor and outdoor cricket, indoor football, cooking, photography, climbing, table tennis and outdoor tennis. Extras take place after school time.

Notable alumni
 Adam Buxton (journalist and comedian)
 Andrew Lloyd Webber (composer)
 Julian Lloyd Webber (cellist)
 Jason Kouchak (pianist and composer)
 George Benjamin (composer)
 Alfred Enoch (actor)
 Luke McShane (chess player)
 Dan McKenzie (academic)
 Ben Adams (singer)
 Hilary Benn (MP)
 Jacob Rees-Mogg (MP)

Images

See also
 Westminster School

References

External links
Official Website
 ISI Report

Private boys' schools in London
Preparatory schools in London
Educational institutions established in 1943
Private schools in the City of Westminster
1943 establishments in England
Church of England private schools in the Diocese of London
Westminster School